Garay Latif oglu Asadov (192312 October 1944) was an Azerbaijani Red Army sergeant and a posthumous Hero of the Soviet Union. Asadov was posthumously awarded the title on 24 March 1945 for his actions during the Debrecen Offensive Operation. He was reported to have killed 16 German soldiers and was killed while covering a bunker opening with his body.

Early life 
Asadov was born in 1923 in Shakhsevan in a family of Azerbaijani ethnicity. He received primary education. Asadov worked on the kolkhoz after graduating.

World War II 
Asadov was drafted into the Red Army in 1942 and fought in combat from June. He fought in the Battle of Kursk, the capture of Right-bank Ukraine, and Moldova. Asadov became a rifleman in the 281st Guards Rifle Regiment of the 93rd Guards Rifle Division. In October 1944, he fought in the Battle of Debrecen.

On 6 October, during the battle for Vlaha, 10 kilometers southwest of Cluj, Asadov reportedly killed more than 10 German soldiers with grenades. During the battle for Huedin,  he reportedly killed the crew of a German fire and opened fire on the German troops with it, reportedly killing more than 24 German soldiers. For his actions in Huedin, Asadov received the Order of the Red Banner on 30 November. On 12 October, during the battle for Marghita, a group of soldiers led by Asadov fought a 40-man German force. The Soviet troops attacked, reportedly killing 16 and capturing others. Later that day, in fighting for the railway station, Asadov reportedly covered the opening of a bunker with his body. On 24 March 1945, he was posthumously awarded the title Hero of the Soviet Union and the Order of Lenin.

Legacy 
A sovkhoz and secondary school in Shakhsevan were named for Asadov, along with a street in Beylagan.

References 

1923 births
1944 deaths
People from Beylagan District
Soviet military personnel of World War II from Azerbaijan
Heroes of the Soviet Union
Recipients of the Order of Lenin
Recipients of the Order of the Red Banner
Deaths in Romania
Soviet military personnel killed in World War II